The Cross River is a  river in northern Minnesota, the United States. It is a direct tributary of Lake Superior.

Cross River was named for a wooden cross erected at the river's mouth by a priest.

See also
List of rivers of Minnesota

References

Minnesota Watersheds
USGS Hydrologic Unit Map - State of Minnesota (1974)

Rivers of Cook County, Minnesota
Rivers of Lake County, Minnesota
Rivers of Minnesota
Tributaries of Lake Superior
Northern Minnesota trout streams